Copper(II) sulfate, also known as copper sulphate, is an inorganic compound with the chemical formula . It forms hydrates , where n can range from 1 to 7. The pentahydrate (n = 5), a bright blue crystal, is the most commonly encountered hydrate of copper(II) sulfate. Older names for the pentahydrate include blue vitriol, bluestone, vitriol of copper, and Roman vitriol. It exothermically dissolves in water to give the aquo complex , which has octahedral molecular geometry. The structure of the solid pentahydrate reveals a polymeric structure wherein copper is again octahedral but bound to four water ligands. The  centers are interconnected by sulfate anions to form chains. Anhydrous copper sulfate is a light grey powder.

Preparation and occurrence

Copper sulfate is produced industrially by treating copper metal with hot concentrated sulfuric acid or copper oxides with dilute sulfuric acid. For laboratory use, copper sulfate is usually purchased. Copper sulfate can also be produced by slowly leaching low-grade copper ore in air; bacteria may be used to hasten the process.

Commercial copper sulfate is usually about 98% pure copper sulfate, and may contain traces of water. Anhydrous copper sulfate is 39.81 percent copper and 60.19 percent sulfate by mass, and in its blue, hydrous form, it is 25.47% copper, 38.47% sulfate (12.82% sulfur) and 36.06% water by mass. Four types of crystal size are provided based on its usage: large crystals (10–40 mm), small crystals (2–10 mm), snow crystals (less than 2 mm), and windswept powder (less than 0.15 mm).

Chemical properties
Copper(II) sulfate pentahydrate decomposes before melting.

The chemistry of aqueous copper sulfate is simply that of copper aquo complex, since the sulfate is not bound to copper in such solutions. Thus, such solutions react with concentrated hydrochloric acid to give tetrachlorocuprate(II):

Similarly treatment of such solutions with zinc gives metallic copper, as described by this simplified equation:

A further illustration of such "single metal replacement reactions" occurs when a piece of iron is submerged in a solution of copper sulfate:

In high school and general chemistry education, copper sulfate is used as an electrolyte for galvanic cells, usually as a cathode solution. For example, in a zinc/copper cell, copper ion in copper sulfate solution absorbs electron from zinc and forms metallic copper.
, E°cell = 0.34 V

Copper sulfate is commonly included in teenager chemistry sets and undergraduate experiments. It is often used to grow crystals in schools and in copper plating experiments, despite its toxicity. It is used to demonstrate the principle of mineral hydration. The pentahydrate form, which is blue, is heated, turning the copper sulfate into the anhydrous form which is white, while the water that was present in the pentahydrate form evaporates. When water is then added to the anhydrous compound, it turns back into the pentahydrate form, regaining its blue color. Copper(II) sulfate pentahydrate can easily be produced by crystallization from solution as copper(II) sulfate, which is hygroscopic.

Uses

As a fungicide and herbicide
Copper sulfate has been used for control of algae in lakes and related fresh waters subject to eutrophication. It "remains the most effective algicidal treatment".

Bordeaux mixture, a suspension of copper(II) sulfate and calcium hydroxide, is used to control fungus on grapes, melons, and other berries. It is produced by mixing a water solution of copper sulfate and a suspension of slaked lime.

A dilute solution of copper sulfate is used to treat aquarium fishes for parasitic infections, and is also used to remove snails from aquariums and zebra mussels from water pipes. Copper ions are highly toxic to fish, however. Most species of algae can be controlled with very low concentrations of copper sulfate.

Analytical reagent
Several chemical tests utilize copper sulfate. It is used in Fehling's solution and Benedict's solution to test for reducing sugars, which reduce the soluble blue copper(II) sulfate to insoluble red copper(I) oxide. Copper(II) sulfate is also used in the Biuret reagent to test for proteins.

Copper sulfate is used to test blood for anemia. The blood is dropped into a solution of copper sulfate of known specific gravity—blood with sufficient hemoglobin sinks rapidly due to its density, whereas blood which sinks slowly or not at all has an insufficient amount of hemoglobin.  Clincally relevant, however, modern laboratories utilize automated blood analyzers for accurate quantitative hemoglobin determinations, as opposed to older qualitative means.

In a flame test, the copper ions of copper sulfate emit a deep green light, a much deeper green than the flame test for barium.

Organic synthesis
Copper sulfate is employed at a limited level in organic synthesis. The anhydrous salt is used as a dehydrating agent for forming and manipulating acetal groups. The hydrated salt can be intimately mingled with potassium permanganate to give an oxidant for the conversion of primary alcohols.

Rayon production
Reaction with ammonium hydroxide yields tetraamminecopper(II) sulfate or Schweizer's reagent which was used to dissolve cellulose in the industrial production of Rayon.

Niche uses
Copper(II) sulfate has attracted many niche applications over the centuries. In industry copper sulfate has multiple applications. In printing it is an additive to book-binding pastes and glues to protect paper from insect bites; in building it is used as an additive to concrete to improve water resistance and discourage anything from growing on it. Copper sulfate can be used as a coloring ingredient in artworks, especially glasses and potteries. Copper sulfate is also used in firework manufacture as a blue coloring agent, but it is not safe to mix copper sulfate with chlorates when mixing firework powders.

Copper sulfate was once used to kill bromeliads, which serve as mosquito breeding sites. Copper sulfate is used as a molluscicide to treat bilharzia in tropical countries.

Art
In 2008, the artist Roger Hiorns filled an abandoned waterproofed council flat in London with 75,000 liters of copper(II) sulfate water solution. The solution was left to crystallize for several weeks before the flat was drained, leaving crystal-covered walls, floors and ceilings. The work is titled Seizure. Since 2011, it has been on exhibition at the Yorkshire Sculpture Park.

Etching
Copper(II) sulfate is used to etch zinc or copper plates for intaglio printmaking.
It is also used to etch designs into copper for jewelry, such as for Champlevé.

Dyeing
Copper(II) sulfate can be used as a mordant in vegetable dyeing. It often highlights the green tints of the specific dyes.

Electronics
An aqueous solution of copper(II) sulfate is often used as the resistive element in liquid resistors.

Other forms of copper sulfate
Anhydrous copper(II) sulfate can be produced by dehydration of the commonly available pentahydrate copper sulfate. In nature, it is found as the very rare mineral known as chalcocyanite. The pentahydrate also occurs in nature as chalcanthite. Other rare copper sulfate minerals include bonattite (trihydrate), boothite (heptahydrate), and the monohydrate compound poitevinite. There are numerous other, more complex, copper(II) sulfate minerals known, with environmentally important basic copper(II) sulfates like langite and posnjakite.

Toxicological effects 

Copper(II) salts have an LD50 of 100 mg/kg. It is harmless enough to be a routine component of high school experiments and to be used widely in swimming lakes to control algae.

Copper(II) sulfate was used in the past as an emetic. It is now considered too toxic for this use. It is still listed as an antidote in the World Health Organization's Anatomical Therapeutic Chemical Classification System.

See also
Chalcanthum
Vitriol

References

Bibliography

External links

National Pollutant Inventory – Copper and compounds fact sheet

Copper(II) compounds
Sulfates
Desiccants
Herbicides